Carlo Petitti di Roreto was an Italian general who was most notable during his service in the Italo-Turkish War and World War I.

Biography
Carlo Petitti di Roreto was the son of a noble Piedmontese family, his grandfather was Carlo Ilarione Petitti di Roreto, a famous economist and writer and he was the grandson of Senator Agostino Petitti Bagliani of Roreto.

After embarking on a military career at the end of the nineteenth century, he participated in the clashes of the First World War, where from June 4, 1915, to October 29, 1915, he obtained command of the 1st Infantry Division as a general. In 1916 he obtained command of the 35th Division, taking possession of it at 3.30 pm on May 15 of that year near Malga Zolle, on the southern side of Monte Toraro, precisely on the occasion of the start of the Austrian offensive on the highlands. He was in command of the Italian expeditionary force in Macedonia from August 1916 to June 1917.

From 1918, he was promoted to general of the army corps, he obtained the command of the XXIII Corps with specifically divisions 28 and 61, which during the Second Battle of the Piave River operated on the right bank of the Piave from Croce di Piave to the sea. On November 2, 1918, he became governor of Trieste and Venezia Giulia, keeping the post until July 1919.

At the end of the First World War, he obtained the appointment as general commander of the Carabinieri on 25 August 1919, remaining in office until 29 October 1921 .

In December 1919 he was appointed Senator of the Kingdom of Italy.

In politics an active exponent of the traditional liberal currents, he was a personality with a gruff trait, even haughty in the opinion of foreign observers (often prejudicedly hostile, or prejudiced, for their own interests) not accustomed to the "Piedmontese" character, but considered a good administrator and a skilled mediator, as proved in Macedonia and Venezia Giulia.

Edoardo Schott, war correspondent in Thessaloniki called him "a haughty Italian of high Piedmontese nobility".

He died in Turin in 1933.

Awards
Military Order of Savoy, Knight

Military Order of Savoy, Commander

Military Order of Savoy, Grand Order

Medal of Military Valor

Order of Saints Maurice and Lazarus, Commander (December 30, 1919)
Order of Saints Maurice and Lazarus, Knight
Order of the Crown of Italy, Grand Gross
War Merit Cross
Commemorative Medal for the Italo-Turkish War 1911-1912
Commemorative Medal for the Italo-Austrian War 1915–1918
Commemorative Medal of the Unity of Italy
Allied Victory Medal

Foreign awards
: Legion of Honour
: Croix de guerre 1914–1918
: Order of the White Eagle

References

Bibliography
Carlo Petitti di Roreto, on Sapienza.it De Agostini
Carlo Petitti di Roreto, on Senators of Italy Senate of the Republic

Italian generals
1862 births
1933 deaths
Italian military personnel of the Italo-Turkish War
Italian military personnel of World War I
20th-century Italian politicians
Members of the Senate of the Kingdom of Italy